LMS Stanier Class 5 can refer to;

 LMS Stanier Class 5 4-6-0
 LMS Stanier Mogul 2-6-0